Løjenkær is a village and civil parish of the municipality of Århus.

It is the village where Carl Værnet was born.

References 

 
Cities and towns in the Central Denmark Region